Louis or Lewis Murphy may refer to:

Louis Murphy, American football player
Lew Murphy (Lewis Murphy), Air Force pilot and mayor of Tucson, Arizona
Louis Murphy (politician), Canadian politician
Lewis Murphy (rugby league), English rugby league player